Abhiyum Anuvum (in Tamil) / Abhiyude Katha Anuvinteyum (in Malayalam) is a 2018 Indian bilingual romantic drama film directed by B. R. Vijayalakshmi, written by Uday Mahesh and starring Tovino Thomas and Piaa Bajpai. The film was produced by Yoodlee Films, a subsidiary production company of Saregama. The film marks the debut of Tovino Thomas in Tamil. The film was simultaneously shot in both Tamil and Malayalam languages titled Abhiyum Anuvum and Abhiyude Kadha Anuvinteyum respectively. Both the versions released on 25 May 2018. It also got its OTT release, 3 years later on 25 July 2021 through Amazon Prime and Neestream.

Plot
Abhi and Anu live diametrically different lives, far removed from the space each other occupies. Abhi is the average boy next door with a regular job and a lifestyle that borders on the mundane, and is very close and dependent on his mother. Anu is an organic farmer in Ooty — a lively girl, passionate about social issues and unafraid to challenge social responsibility and the stigma around her. They meet, are instantly attracted to each other, and get married on a whim. Subsequently, Anu's pregnancy augurs the start of a new phase in their lives. It all comes crashing down when their families meet, and a shocking disclosure conspired by a strange twist of fate is revealed. Torn between what the society expects him to do and what his love needs to conquer, Abhi is faced with a life-altering decision.

Cast
Tovino Thomas as Abhi
Piaa Bajpai as Anu
Samyukta Hornad as Dhivya (Dhivi)
Prabhu as Prabhu
Suhasini as Revathy
Rohini as Meena, Anu's mother
Udhayabhanu Maheswaran as Abhi's father
Dheepa Ramanujam as Abhi's mother
Kalairani as Kamatchi 
Manobala as Abhi's Boss
VJ Sangeetha as Swathi
Bigg Boss Julie as Bar dancer
Kavithalayaa Krishnan as Taxi driver

Soundtrack
The soundtrack was composed by Dharan Kumar, and lyrics were written by Madhan Karky.

"Saregama" — Haricharan, Shashaa Tirupati
"Engada Pona" — Benny Dayal, Nikhita Gandhi
"Engada Pona" (male) - Benny Dayal
"Engada Pona" (female) - Nikhita Gandhi
"Theme Music"

Release 
Abhiyum Anuvum was released in theatres on 5 March 2018.

References

External links
 

2018 films
2010s Tamil-language films
Indian romantic drama films
Indian multilingual films
2018 multilingual films
2018 romantic drama films
2010s Malayalam-language films
Films scored by Dharan Kumar